Michael Coletti may refer to:

 Steven Adler (born 1965), American musician, born Michael Coletti
 Michael Coletti (motorcyclist) (born 1995), Italian motorcycle racer